The rigotte de Condrieu is a type of cheese made with goat's milk which originates in the Lyonnaise region of France and is named after the town of Condrieu.

It has French AOC since 2008 and acquired European PDO in November 2013.

See also
 List of goat milk cheeses

References

External links
 Rigotte de Condrieu AOP info  
 DOOR European Certificate Database Entry

French cheeses
Goat's-milk cheeses